Organ may refer to:

Biology
 Organ (biology), a part of an organism

Musical instruments
 Organ (music), a family of keyboard musical instruments characterized by sustained tone
 Electronic organ, an electronic keyboard instrument
 Hammond organ, an electro-mechanical keyboard instrument
 Pipe organ, a musical instrument that produces sound when pressurized air is driven through a series of pipes
 Street organ, a mobile, automatic mechanical pneumatic organ played by an organ grinder
 Theatre organ, a pipe organ originally designed specifically for imitation of an orchestra

Films
 Organ (film), a 1996 Japanese film about organ thieves
 The Organ (film), a 1965 Slovak film

Periodicals
 Organ, any official periodical (i.e., magazine, newsletter, or similar publication) of an organization
 Organ (magazine), a UK music magazine founded in 1986
 The Organ (magazine), a quarterly publication for organ enthusiasts, founded in 1921
 The Organ (newspaper), an underground newspaper published in San Francisco from 1970 to 1972

Places

United States 
 Organ, New Mexico, an unincorporated community
 Organ Mountains, New Mexico
 The Organ (Zion), a summit in Utah
 Organ Rock Formation, in Utah, New Mexico and Arizona
 Organ Cave, Virginia

Elsewhere 
 Organ Peak, Graham Land, Antarctica
 Serra dos Órgãos, or Organ Range, a mountain range in Brazil
 Organ, Hautes-Pyrénées, a commune in France
 Organ, Iran, a village in Chaharmahal and Bakhtiari Province, Iran
 Organ-e Kord, a village in Qazvin Province, Iran
 Organ-e Tork, a village in Qazvin Province, Iran

Other uses
 Organ, a division within an organization, for example, organs of United Nations
 Organs of state, branches of power within a government
 Organ, an old word for a mental faculty, particularly in the context of phrenology
 Organ, a slang word for a penis
 Organ (surname), a list of people with the surname
 The Organ (band), a Canadian rock band 2001–2006
 Organ (album), a 2021 album by Dimension

See also